Go-Coachhire Ltd is a bus operator running a total of 40 bus services (including school services) across Kent and Sussex. The majority of these services are operated on behalf of Kent County Council from their depot in Swanley.

History

Go-Coach was founded in 2008 by Austin Blackburn. The company began operating as a coach hire company initially just using a single coach.

In April 2010, Go-Coach began operating bus services for the first time when they took over the Kent County Council tendered routes 401 (Sevenoaks to Westerham) and 421 (Sevenoaks to Swanley) from Arriva Southern Counties. In May 2011, Go Coach extended route 421 to Dartford to replace the Arriva Southern Counties route 423 bringing the operator into the town for the first time. The companies Dartford services were further boosted with the instruction of the Dart local town services in 2014.

In April 2014, Go-Coach expanded its operations into Edenbridge by taking over routes 232, 234, 238, 631 and 632 from Arriva Southern Counties. A number of its Sevenoaks services were altered at the same time.

In 2015, a number of Go-Coach services were boosted. The company took over a number of Kent County Council contracted services as well as introducing new circular town service 8 in Sevenoaks at the same time. Go-Coach also upgraded and took over existing route 401 on a commercial basis in 2015, this being the first time that the company had operated a bus service in this way.

In July 2017, Go-Coach introduced two new routes in Sevenoaks (routes 431 and 435) in response to Arriva Southern Counties withdrawing major parts of their route 402 service at the same time.

In April 2019, Arriva Southern Counties withdrew a number of their local services in Sevenoaks. Go Coach introduced a number of replacement services and at the same time became the network operator of the town.

In December 2020, Go-Coach launched the new E1 circular bus service in Edenbridge giving the town a dedicated local service for the first time.

On 23 August 2021, Go-Coach introduced the 24-hour Fastrack branded AZ service between Dartford and Gravesend, serving the new Amazon LCY3 distribution centre in Dartford. On 2 April 2022, this service was  transferred to Arriva Kent Thameside in April 2022 with the Amazon LCY3 also now served by the current Fastrack A service.

Garages and services
Go-Coach run services from a single depot Swanley which runs a mixture of commercial and school services as well as services operated on behalf of Kent County Council with a total of 40 routes. Go Coach operate a number of rural services across Kent and as such, a number of their services operate at very low frequencies with limited operating hours. Go Coach are also the main bus operator in the town of Sevenoaks (since Arriva Southern Counties withdrew a number of their Sevenoaks routes in April 2019) and currently run and operate Sevenoaks bus station.

Go-Coach currently operate the following services (excluding school services):

Go2 Sevenoaks
Since April 2020, Go-Coach have operated the Go2 demand responsive service in Sevenoaks in partnership with ViaVan. The service is designed to allow passengers to hail buses to their locations to remove the need for unnecessary bus operations.

Service History

April 2020
The Go2 demand responsive service was introduced in April 2020 when Go-Coach suspended all of its fixed line bus services in Sevenoaks and Edenbridge due to the COVID-19 pandemic.

The service initially ran Monday-Saturday only and covered the majority of the Sevenoaks District as well as extending north to Orpington and south to Tonbridge. It also served a number of hospitals outside of the main operating area including Tunbridge Wells Hospital in Pembury, Queen Mary's Hospital in Sidcup and Princess Royal Hospital in Locksbottom.

August 2020
In August 2020, Go-Coach reinstated a number of their fixed line bus services in Sevenoaks and Go2 continued to operate alongside these services. At the same time, the service was removed from Orpington and Tonbridge as well as the hospitals outside the main operating area.

January 2021
In January 2021, Go-Coach again suspended a number of its Sevenoaks services due to the COVID-19 pandemic and replaced them with Go2.

April 2021
In April 2021, the Go2 service area was expanded to serve West Kingsdown, East Hill, Fairseat and Stansted.

A limited Sunday service was also introduced on the service covering Sevenoaks, Swanley and West Kingsdown.

At the same time, a number of Go-Coach fixed line bus services in Sevenoaks were reintroduced and Go2 again operates alongside these.

January 2023
In January 2023, a number of major changes were made to Go2 in response to a reduction in funding from Kent County Council. The service was scaled back to operate on weekdays and Saturdays from 06:00-19:00 only, with the Sunday service being withdrawn. In addition, the operating area was reduced, no longer serving Swanley, Edenbridge or West Kingsdown.

Operating Area
As of January 2023, the key areas served by the Go2 service include: Sevenoaks Town Centre, Sevenoaks Weald, Ide Hill, Westerham, Sundridge, Brasted, Chipstead, Dunton Green, Knockholt, Halstead, Shoreham, Otford, Godden Green, Seal and Kemsing.

References

External links

Bus operators in Kent
Transport companies established in 2008
2008 establishments in England